Cutileiro is a surname. Notable people with the surname include:

João Cutileiro (1937–2021), Portuguese sculptor
José Cutileiro (1934–2020), Portuguese diplomat and writer